Events in the year 1989 in Mexico.

Incumbents

Federal government
 President: Carlos Salinas de Gortari
 Interior Secretary (SEGOB): Fernando Gutiérrez Barrios
 Secretary of Foreign Affairs (SRE): Fernando Solana
 Communications Secretary (SCT): Andrés Caso Lombardo
 Education Secretary (SEP): Manuel Bartlett
 Secretary of Defense (SEDENA): Antonio Riviello Bazán
 Secretary of Navy: Luis Carlos Ruano Angulo
 Secretary of Labor and Social Welfare: Arsenio Farell Cubillas
 Secretary of Welfare: Patricio Chirinos Calero
 Secretary of Public Education: Manuel Bartlett Díaz
 Tourism Secretary (SECTUR): Carlos Hank González 
 Secretary of the Environment (SEMARNAT): María de los Angeles Moreno
 Secretary of Health (SALUD): Jesús Kumate Rodríguez

Supreme Court

 President of the Supreme Court: Carlos del Río Rodríguez

Governors

 Aguascalientes: Miguel Ángel Barberena Vega, (Institutional Revolutionary Party, PRI)
 Baja California
Xicoténcatl Leyva Mortera (PRI), until January 5
Oscar Baylón Chacón, (PRI), January 6 to October 31.
Ernesto Ruffo Appel, National Action Party (PAN), starting November 1. Ruffo Appel was the first governor who was not a member of PRI since 1929.
 Baja California Sur: 
 Campeche: Miguel Ángel Barberena Vega
 Chiapas: Víctor Manuel Liceaga Ruibal
 Chihuahua: Francisco Barrio
 Coahuila: Eliseo Mendoza Berrueto
 Colima: Elías Zamora Verduzco
 Durango: Armando del Castillo Franco
 Guanajuato: Rafael Corrales Ayala
 Guerrero: José Francisco Ruiz Massieu
 Hidalgo: Adolfo Lugo Verduzco
 Jalisco: Francisco Rodríguez Gómez/Guillermo Cosío Vidaurri
 State of Mexico: Mario Ramón Beteta/Ignacio Pichardo Pagaza 
 Michoacán: Genovevo Figueroa Zamudio
 Morelos: Antonio Riva Palacio (PRI).
 Nayarit: Celso Humberto Delgado Ramírez
 Nuevo León: Jorge Treviño
 Oaxaca: Heladio Ramírez López
 Puebla: Mariano Piña Olaya
 Querétaro: Mariano Palacios Alcocer
 Quintana Roo: Miguel Borge Martín
 San Luis Potosí: no data
 Sinaloa: Francisco Labastida
 Sonora: Rodolfo Félix Valdés
 Tabasco: José María Peralta López
 Tamaulipas: Américo Villarreal Guerra	
 Tlaxcala: Beatriz Paredes Rangel
 Veracruz: Dante Delgado Rannauro
 Yucatán: Víctor Manzanilla Schaffer
 Zacatecas: Genaro Borrego Estrada
Regent of Mexico City: Manuel Camacho Solís

Events
 Music group Café Tacuba is founded. 
 Newspaper El Economista is founded.
 The Guadalajara light rail system begins operating.
 The Santa Teresa la Antigua Alternative Art Center opens its doors.
 February 13: Centro de Investigación y Seguridad Nacional (México) and the National Human Rights Commission (Mexico) are founded.
 March 2: FONCA, (Fondo Nacional para la Cultura y las Artes) is founded. 
 March 3: Miss Latin America 1989 held in Hermosillo, Sonora. 
 May 5: The Party of the Democratic Revolution is founded.  
 May 23: Miss Universe 1989 held in Cancún, Quintana Roo.  
 August 10: The San Rafael River train disaster
 August 25–29: Hurricane Kiko 
 October 19: The Autonomous University of Campeche is established.

Awards
Belisario Domínguez Medal of Honor – Raúl Castellano Jiménez

Births
January 10: Zuria Vega, actress and singer
June 7: Sofía Sisniega, actress
September 14: Miriam Zetter, ten-pin bowler

Deaths
August 7 — Leopoldo Sánchez Celis, Governor of Sinaloa 1963–1968 (b. 1916)
October 30 — Pedro Vargas, Mexican singer and actor (b. 1906)

Film

 List of Mexican films of 1989

Sport

 1988–89 Mexican Primera División season. 
 1989 Caribbean Series in Mazatlan at the Estadio Teodoro Mariscal. 
 Tecolotes de Nuevo Laredo win the Mexican League.
 1989 Tournament of the Americas in Mexico City. 
 1989 Mexican Grand Prix. 
 1989 480 km of Mexico.

External links

References

 
Mexico